Holneiker Mendes Marreiros (born April 25, 1995) is a Brazilian footballer, currently playing for Kyoto Sanga FC.

Playing career
Mendes joined a J2 League club, Zweigen Kanazawa, in 2015; he then moved to Tochigi SC during 2017 season.

Club statistics
Updated to 31 January 2018.

References

External links

 Profile at Tochigi SC

1995 births
Living people
Brazilian footballers
Brazilian expatriate footballers
Brazilian expatriate sportspeople in Japan
Expatriate footballers in Japan
J1 League players
J2 League players
J3 League players
Zweigen Kanazawa players
Tochigi SC players
Ventforet Kofu players
Kyoto Sanga FC players
Association football defenders